Marco Antonio Salomone (died 1615) was a Roman Catholic prelate who served as Bishop of Sora (1591–1608).

Biography
On 31 July 1591, Marco Antonio Salomone was appointed during the papacy of Pope Gregory XIV as Bishop of Sora. He served as Bishop of Sora until his resignation in 1608. He died on 12 October 1615. While bishop, he was the principal co-consecrator of Jullio del Carretto, Bishop of Casale Monferrato (1594), Giulio Calvo d'Albeto, Bishop of Sora (1608), and Rodolfo Paleotti, Bishop of Imola (1611).

References

External links and additional sources
 (for Chronology of Bishops) 
 (for Chronology of Bishops) 

16th-century Italian Roman Catholic bishops
1615 deaths
Bishops appointed by Pope Gregory XIV